Photinia glabra, the Japanese photinia, is a species in the family Rosaceae.

References

glabra